The Snake Alley Historic District is a nationally recognized historic district located in Burlington, Iowa, United States. It was listed on the National Register of Historic Places in 1975, and it was included in the Heritage Hill Historic District that surrounds it, in 1982. The historic district is largely a residential area  that includes ten contributing properties. It is centered on Snake Alley, a  brick roadway built in 1894 that rises  from Washington Street to Columbia Street. The alley receives its name from the five half curves and two quarter curves that climb the hill. Cobblestone Alley is the eastern boundary of the district. It is a very steep roadway composed of large, limestone blocks. Six houses, built between 1845 and about 1880, surround Snake Alley. Schwartz' Auto Electric Service building and the First United Church of Christ complex round out the contributing buildings.

See also
 National Register of Historic Places listings in Des Moines County, Iowa

References

National Register of Historic Places in Des Moines County, Iowa
Burlington, Iowa
Historic districts on the National Register of Historic Places in Iowa
Historic districts in Des Moines County, Iowa